Larbi Doghmi (born in 1931 in Rabat, died 28 October 1994 in Rabat) was a Moroccan actor. He starred in numerous Moroccan films and television shows, and was known for his sound dubbing of Bollywood films. He also has to his credit international films such as The Man Who Would Be King, where he portrayed Ootah.

Filmography 

 1955 : Le médecin malgré lui 
 1968 : Quand mûrissent les dattes
 1975 : The Man Who Would Be King
 1977 : The Hyena's Sun
 1977 : Blood Wedding
 1979 : The Black Stallion
 1982 : The Black Stallion Returns
 1982:  Brahim yach
 1983: Bamou
 1986 : Allan Quatermain and the Lost City of Gold
 1988 : Caftan of Love 
 1991 : Le Vent de la Toussaint

External links

References 

Moroccan male film actors
1931 births
1994 deaths
Moroccan male stage actors